Synthymia is a genus of moths of the family Noctuidae. It contains only one species, Synthymia fixa, The Goldwing, which is found in southern Europe and North Africa.

Technical description and variation

S. fixa F. (= monogramma Hbn.) (48 i). Forewing ash grey in the male, darker, slightly greenish grey in the female the outer half of wing suffused with brownish, the whole speckled with black; orbicular stigma oval, grey in a whitish ring, placed vertically at the edge of the grey basal space; reniform also vertical, an elongate figure of 8, white with dark grey centres; space between them crossed by a deep brown band, sometimes velvety brown in cell, the median vein showing white across it; inner and outer lines brownish, ill defined; the inner waved, nearly vertical, the outer sinuous edged by grey and on the costa whitish; subterminal line thick, whitish; fringe dark-mottled; hindwing orange, deeper in female than in male; the base diffusely dark; terminal border olive brown, broad at apex, with traces of a submarginal line on inner margin; in the male more fuscous tinged, with traces of outer and submarginal lines; in the ab. griseofusa ab.nov. (= ab. 2. Hmps.) the whole of the hindwing is fuscous. Larva dark green, the dorsum lighter; dorsal and subdorsal lines pale yellow, edged with dark green; lateral stripe white, broad, with dark upper edge; head small, yellowish; thoracic plate black; anal plate brown. The wingspan is 37–40 mm.

Biology
Adults are on wing from April to July. There is one generation per year.

The larvae feed on the flowers of Psoralea bituminosa.

References

External links

Natural History Museum Lepidoptera genus database
Synthymia at funet
Synthymia fixa on Lepiforum.de

Hadeninae
Moths of Europe